The 20474/ 20473 Chetak Express is a Superfast Express express train belonging to Indian Railways – North Western Railway zone that runs between Udaipur City and Delhi Sarai Rohilla in India.

It operates as train number 20474 from Udaipur City to Delhi Sarai Rohilla and as train number 20473 in the reverse direction, serving the states of Rajasthan, Haryana & Delhi.

It is named after the legendary horse of Maharana Pratap – Chetak who has been immortalized in the ballads of Rajasthan. Previously this train ran as a Metre-Gauge Express till 2004.

Coaches

The 20474/ 20473Chetak Express has 1 AC 2 tier, 2 AC 3 tier, 8 Sleeper Class, 6 General Unreserved & 2 SLR (Seating cum Luggage Rake) Coaches. It does not carry a pantry car.

As is customary with most train services in India, coach composition may be amended at the discretion of Indian Railways depending on demand.

Service

As the average speed of the train is above , as per Indian Railways rules, its fare includes a Superfast surcharge.

Routeing

Traction

As large sections of the route are fully electrified, an Gaziabad-based WAP-5 locomotive powers the train for its entire journey.

Direction reversal
The train reverses its direction at;
 .

Operation

 20474 Chetak Express leaves Udaipur City on a daily basis and reaches Delhi Sarai Rohilla the next day.
 20473 Chetak Express leaves Delhi Sarai Rohilla on a daily basis and reaches Udaipur City the next day.

Rake sharing
The train sharing its rake with 22471/22472 Bikaner–Delhi Sarai Rohilla Intercity Express.

References 

 https://www.youtube.com/watch?v=pwOIMx08jCc
 http://www.tripadvisor.in/ShowTopic-g297665-i4566-k5871166-Mewar_vs_Chetak_express-Rajasthan.html
 https://www.flickr.com/photos/wp7713/5941815507/
 http://www.icomplaints.in/mismanagement-in-2a-in-chetak-express-delhi-udaipur-08048.html

External links

Transport in Udaipur
Transport in Delhi
Railway services introduced in 1969
Named passenger trains of India
Rail transport in Rajasthan
Rail transport in Haryana
Rail transport in Delhi
Express trains in India